Pretzien is a village and a former municipality in the district of Salzlandkreis, in Saxony-Anhalt, Germany. Since 1 January 2009, it is part of the town Schönebeck.

In June 2006 there was a scandal after some newspapers reported, that some neo-nazis had burned the book The Diary of a Young Girl (by Anne Frank) at a public celebration of Solstice on 24 June. Pritzien Mayor Friedrich Harwig had supported the right winged club Heimat-Bund Ostelbien e.V., which had organized the celebration. The club had been founded by former members of the NPD.

External links 
 Homepage of Pretzien 

Former municipalities in Saxony-Anhalt
Salzlandkreis